The 1908 Bewdley by-election was held on 29 February 1908.  The by-election was held due to the death of the incumbent Conservative MP, Alfred Baldwin.  It was won by his son and the future Prime Minister, the Conservative candidate Stanley Baldwin, who was unopposed.

References

1908 elections in the United Kingdom
1908 in England
20th century in Worcestershire
By-elections to the Parliament of the United Kingdom in Worcestershire constituencies
Bewdley
Unopposed by-elections to the Parliament of the United Kingdom (need citation)
February 1908 events